Peakirk railway station served the parish of Peakirk in Cambridgeshire.

The station building was converted into a private residence in the early 1990s. It is notable for having few external alterations, excluding a recent extension. Many of the original features are intact, though the platform and good yards have been removed and been replaced with housing.

References

External links
 Peakirk station on navigable 1946 O. S. map
 Peakirk station on Disused-stations.org.uk

Disused railway stations in Cambridgeshire
Former Great Northern Railway stations
Railway stations in Great Britain opened in 1848
Railway stations in Great Britain closed in 1961
Transport in Peterborough
Buildings and structures in Peterborough